The Campbell School at 1215 Campbell St. in Sandusky, Ohio was built in 1885.  It was designed by J.C. Johnson and built by Adam Feick and brothers.  It has also been known as the Eighth Ward School.  It was listed on the National Register of Historic Places in 1982.

It was built to serve children with deficient eyesight.  It is a two-story limestone building with an arched transom area above its main entrance, with Victorian Gothic style.

References

School buildings on the National Register of Historic Places in Ohio
Gothic Revival architecture in Ohio
School buildings completed in 1885
Buildings and structures in Erie County, Ohio
National Register of Historic Places in Erie County, Ohio